Aeromicrobium marinum is a bacterium from the genus Aeromicrobium which has been isolated from surface water from the Wadden Sea near Germany.

References 

Propionibacteriales
Bacteria described in 2003